Ro is an a priori constructed language created by Rev. Edward Powell Foster beginning in 1904.

Creator
Rev. Edward Powell Foster lived from 1853 through 1937; in Marietta, Ohio. He was buried along with his wife in Riverview Cemetery in Parkersburg, West Virginia.

Characteristics
In Ro, words are constructed using a category system. For example, all words starting with "bofo-" signify colors; the word for red is "bofoc", and yellow is "bofof".  Foster did not simply try to design a better language in general, but to optimize his language for one design criterion: recognizability of unknown words. Foster wrote about Ro:

After working on the language for about two years, Foster published the first booklet about Ro in 1906.  The publication of Ro periodicals was supported by several American sponsors, especially from the Marietta, Ohio area, including Melvil Dewey, inventor of the Dewey Decimal Classification (another attempt to categorize human knowledge), Vice President Charles G. Dawes, George White, who mentioned Ro in the Congressional Record, and Alice Vanderbilt Morris of IALA.  Several more books about Ro by Foster and his wife appeared over the years, as late as 1932.

A common criticism of Ro is that it can be difficult to hear the difference between two words; usually one consonant makes the word different in meaning, but still similar enough that the intended meaning often cannot be guessed from context. This characteristic is common among philosophical languages, which are characterized by vocabulary developed taxonomically, independently of natural languages. A posteriori languages, such as Esperanto and Interlingua, are more popular than the a priori type, perhaps partly because their familiar vocabulary makes them easy to learn and recognize. Conversely, a priori languages are seen as being more neutral because there are so many languages and root words used in different languages may be completely different.

Solresol was an earlier classificatory language that by using a smaller symbol set achieved easier distinctness.  There have been a few more recent attempts to design a language along similar lines, such as Ygyde and the Japanese-made Babm, but most subsequent constructed language makers have avoided this taxonomic or hierarchic design for the reasons mentioned above.

Alphabet and pronunciation
Ro is written with the Latin alphabet. The letters C, J, Q and X are pronounced as: /ʃ/, /ʒ/, /ŋ/ and /χ/ respectively. The vowels (A, E, I, O and U) are pronounced as in the Spanish language.

Sample text
The following sample is from Esperanto, Elvish, and Beyond: The World of Constructed Languages. It is the last stanza of William Cullen Bryant's "Thanatopsis" translated into Ro by Foster himself:

Encoding

References

External links
Ro forum on Yahoo Groups
Dictionary of Ro on sorabji.com

Engineered languages
Constructed languages introduced in the 1900s
1904 introductions
Constructed languages